The 2017 CECAFA Cup was the 39th edition of the annual CECAFA Cup, an international football competition consisting of the national teams of member nations of the Council for East and Central Africa Football Associations (CECAFA). It took place in Kenya in December 2017.

Participants
The following teams were confirmed to be participating in the tournament.  National teams from Libya and Zimbabwe will participate in place of Djibouti and Eritrea. Zambia were to replace to Eritrea but later pulled out of the competition.  Somalia and Sudan also withdrew from the tournament in mid November. Zimbabwe withdrew in November 2017.

Match officials
The match officials, which included 8 referees and 8 assistant referees, were announced on November 17, 2017.

Referees
  George Gatogato (Burundi)
  Twagirumukiza Abdoul Karim  (Rwanda)
  Peter Waweru  (Kenya)
  Antony Ogwayo (Kenya)
  Alex Muhabi (Uganda)
  Nassor Mfaume (Zanzibar)
  Sassy Elly Ally  (Tanzania)
  Malong Ring Akech  (South Sudan)

Venues

Group stage

Group A

Group B

Knockout stage

Bracket

Semi-finals

Third place match

Final

Goalscorers

4 goals

 Derrick Nsibambi

3 goals

 Khamis Musa Makame

2 goals
 
 Pierre Kwizera
 Abubakher Sanni
 Abel Yalew
 Masoud Juma
 Ibrahim Juma
 Mohamed Issa
 Kassim Suleiman

1 goal

 Laudit Mavugo
 Shassiri Nahimana
 Cedric Dani Urasenga
 Dawa Hotessa
 Whyvonne Isuza
 Ovella Ochieng
 Vincent Oburu
 Duncan Otieno
 Zakaria Al Harish
 Muhadjiri Hakizimana
 Atak Lual
 Himid Mao Mkami
 Milton Karisa
 Manko Kaweesa
 Nicholas Wadada
 Ibrahim Ahmada
 Mudathir Yahya

References 

CECAFA Cup
CECAFA Cup
CECAFA Cup
International association football competitions hosted by Kenya
CECAFA Cup